Aleksandar Tijanić (13 December 1949 – 28 October 2013) was a Serbian journalist and director of the country's public broadcaster Radio Television of Serbia from 2004 to 2013. During his career he was a star columnist for leading newspapers and magazines published in SFR Yugoslavia and Serbia, editor in chief of several prominent television stations, political advisor to prominent Serbian politicians, and Information Minister for four months in 1996 in the government headed by Mirko Marjanović during the rule of Slobodan Milošević.

He was very much a polarising figure in Serbian society and gathered a great deal of admirers as well as enemies throughout the years.
He died on October 28, 2013 from a heart attack.

Early life
Tijanić was born in Đakovica, FPR Yugoslavia. After finishing high school in his home town, he moved to Belgrade to study journalism at University of Belgrade's Faculty of Political Sciences. He did not complete his studies.

Journalism career
After working his way up during the late 1970s and early 1980s in Politika publications such as Auto Svet, he got a sought-after job at NIN magazine, where he first wrote for the supplement on vehicles and eventually advanced to a position on the editorial board. His job in NIN was a springboard for other top editorial positions. In the mid-1980s he was editor-in-chief of Intervju, another weekly magazine from Politika AD family. In parallel, he wrote for periodical publications in Croatia, Slovenia, and Bosnia.

Following the 8th Session of the Serbian Communist League in September 1987, which was essentially the official date of Slobodan Milošević's ascent to power in Serbia, Tijanić lost all of his writing engagements in the Belgrade publications and was thus reduced to mostly writing in Croatian papers.

He became particularly well known as a political columnist writing for the Split-based weekly newspaper Nedjeljna Dalmacija, which soon earned him the moniker of "the giant of Croatian journalism". In his column titled En Passant he often expressed views critical of the Yugoslav government and Communism in general - something that his Croatian colleagues, silenced after the collapse of the Croatian Spring, seldom dared to do. His column effectively ended in 1990, following the shift in the newspaper's editorial policy as his column was deemed too critical of the new Croatian vice-president Antun Vrdoljak, although Tijanić was allowed to write one last entry in late March 1991. Simultaneous to his Nedjeljna Dalmacija engagement, Tijanić also wrote for Croatian newsmagazines Danas and Start.

In the meantime, during first part of 1991, he was part of the hosting trio on Umijeće življenja talk-show along with Mirjana Bobić-Mojsilović and Dragan Babić. Conceptualized as a free format taped in front of live theater audience at Sarajevo's Teatar Obala, the programme quickly gained country-wide recognition and notability. Tijanić conducted memorable interviews with, among others, Milovan Đilas, notable communist dissident, and Stjepan Mesić, at the time high-ranking official of Franjo Tuđman's Croatian Democratic Union (HDZ) and soon to become last president of SFR Yugoslavia's presidency. The show abruptly ended in May 1991 when a crowd of Muslim extremists mentored by the SDA political party attempted to lynch Tijanić and Bobić-Mojsilović on the day when the interview with Serbian right-wing politician Vojislav Šešelj was supposed to be taped.

Coming back to Belgrade, Tijanić began an editing stint at Sportski žurnal sports daily in June 1991.

In 1993, Tijanić became the head of programming at the recently launched TV Politika.

Controversy
Milorad Ulemek was arrested on May 1 2004. for the assassination of Prime Minister of Serbia Zoran Đinđić. Before Ulemek was transferred to a state prison, he had an unofficial meeting with several political opponents of Zoran Đinđić, including Aleksandar Tijanić.

In March 2005, an entire 200 plus page pamphlet-type book named Slučaj službenika Tijanića solely devoted to denouncing Tijanić as a person and a professional was published in Belgrade by non-governmental organization Lawyers' Committee for Human Rights (YUCOM). The book's cover features a political cartoon-type drawing by Predrag Koraksić Corax, showing Tijanic as a chameleon wearing various political party logos and flags of various countries. The book's author is never mentioned explicitly although it thanks Vladimir Beba Popović, former Serbian government official, for "providing the material so that this publication remains a factual portrayal of an individual's career instead of revenge".

Tijanić sued the publishers of Slučaj službenika Tijanića book for the amount of RSD8.5 million (~€100,000). Following a prolonged, incident-filled process and several appeals, in September 2009, Supreme Court of Serbia ruled in Tijanić's favour ordering YUCOM to pay him RSD200,000 (~€2,200) as well as to cease distribution of the book and to issue a public proclamation about the verdict on the pages of Politika daily.

Private life
He was married and had son Stefan and daughter Zara.

References

External links

  (video)

1949 births
2013 deaths
Writers from Gjakova
Kosovo Serbs
Serbian journalists
Yugoslav journalists